Castelgrande is a town and comune in the province of Potenza, in the Southern Italian region of Basilicata. It is bounded by the comuni of Laviano, Muro Lucano, Pescopagano, Rapone, San Fele.

Castelgrande is part of the Comunita' Montana di Marmo Melandro, previously part of the Comunita' Montana di Marmo Platano.

References

External links
History of Castelgrande

Cities and towns in Basilicata